The 2013 Erie Explosion season was the 7th season for the Continental Indoor Football League (CIFL) franchise.

The Explosion left the United Indoor Football League after the 2012 season. The team remained idle for about a month, while fielding offers to join four different leagues. Owner Bill Stafford ultimately decided to join the Continental Indoor Football League.

The Explosion accrued a perfect season in their first year in the CIFL, winning all ten regular season games (one of which was played against the semi-pro Flint Fury after the Owensboro Rage failed toward the end of the season) and defeated the Saginaw Sting in the CIFL Championship Game.

Roster

Schedule

Regular season

Standings

Postseason

Coaching staff

References

2013 Continental Indoor Football League season
Erie Explosion seasons
Erie Explosion